The simple station SENA is part of the TransMilenio mass-transit system of Bogotá, Colombia, opened in the year 2000.

Location 

The station is located in southern Bogotá, specifically on Avenida NQS with Calle 16 Sur.

It serves the Ciudad Montes area and surrounding neighborhoods.

History 

In 2005, the NQS line of phase two of TransMilenio construction was opened, including this station.

It receives its name due to its proximity to the main campus of SENA (National Learning Service).

Station services

Old trunk services

Main line service

Feeder routes 

This station does not have connections to feeder routes.

Inter-city service 

This station does not have inter-city service.

External links 
 TransMilenio
  Opening of the line from eltiempo.com
  Problemas en la inauguración de la troncal Autopista Sur en eltiempo.com

See also 
 Bogotá
 TransMilenio
 List of TransMilenio stations

TransMilenio